Palos Hills is a city in Cook County, Illinois, United States. It is a southwest suburb of Chicago. The city was established in 1958 and had reached a population of 18,530 in the 2020 census. It is the home of Moraine Valley Community College as well as Amos Alonzo Stagg High School.

Geography

Demographics
As of the 2020 census there were 18,530 people, 7,247 households, and 4,209 families residing in the city. The racial makeup of the city was 81.70% White, 5.77% African American, 0.18% Native American, 2.17% Asian, 0.01% Pacific Islander, 3.39% from other races, and 6.77% from two or more races. Hispanic or Latino of any race were 10.19% of the population.

The top reported ancestries as of 2020 where Polish (29.3%), German (12.7%), Irish (12.6%), Arab (9.6%), and Italian (8.3%).

There were 7,247 households, out of which 38.84% had children under the age of 18 living with them, 43.63% were married couples living together, 10.17% had a female householder with no husband present, and 41.92% were non-families. 36.35% of all households were made up of individuals, and 17.01% had someone living alone who was 65 years of age or older. The average household size was 3.17 and the average family size was 2.34.

The city's age distribution consisted of 18.1% under the age of 18, 8.2% from 18 to 24, 24.5% from 25 to 44, 27.5% from 45 to 64, and 21.8% who were 65 years of age or older. The median age was 44.6 years. For every 100 females, there were 83.3 males. For every 100 females age 18 and over, there were 77.3 males.

The median income for a household in the city was $64,364, and the median income for a family was $81,045. Males had a median income of $57,339 versus $37,926 for females. The per capita income for the city was $34,564. About 9.3% of families and 12.0% of the population were below the poverty line, including 15.1% of those under age 18 and 11.6% of those age 65 or over.

Note: the US Census treats Hispanic/Latino as an ethnic category. This table excludes Latinos from the racial categories and assigns them to a separate category. Hispanics/Latinos can be of any race.

Government
Palos Hills is in Illinois's 3rd congressional district.

The City of Palos Hills operates under a Mayor/Council form of government with a Mayor, Clerk and City Treasurer elected at large and 10 Aldermen elected from 5 dual member wards. 

Mayor Gerald R. Bennett 
City Clerk Rudy Mulderink
City Treasurer Kenneth Nolan.
Aldermen:
Ward 1: Martin Kleefisch and Michael Price
Ward 2: Pauline Stratton and Mark Brachman
Ward 3: A.J. Pasek and Michael Lebarre
Ward 4: Joseph Marrotta and Phil Abed
Ward 5: Dawn Nowak and Donna O'Connel 

North Palos Fire Protection District operates Station 1 and Station 2 in Palos Hills.

Education
Elementary school districts serving Palos Hills:
 North Palos School District 117
 Palos School District 118
 All sections are zoned to Palos South Middle School in Palos Park. Currently sections of Palos Hills in District 118 are divided between Palos East Elementary in Palos Heights and Palos West Elementary in Palos Park. Prior to 2016-2017 all of the District 118 portion of Palos Hills was in the Palos East zone.

Amos Alonzo Stagg High School of the Consolidated High School District 230 serves Palos Hills.

Moraine Valley Community College is the area community college.

Notable people
Nick Drnaso
Christian Dvorak, professional ice hockey player
Matthew Haag
T. J. McFarland, professional baseball pitcher
Herb Schumann, former Cook County commissioner
Ben Skora

References

Further reading

External links
City of Palos Hills official website

Cities in Illinois
Chicago metropolitan area
Cities in Cook County, Illinois
Populated places established in 1958
1958 establishments in Illinois